Nové Sady, until 1948 Ašakert is a village and municipality in the Nitra District in western central Slovakia, in the Nitra Region.

History
In historical records the village was first mentioned in 1156.

Geography
The village lies at an altitude of 168 metres and covers an area of 17.475 km². It has a population of about 1,275 people.

References

External links
 http://www.statistics.sk/mosmis/eng/run.html

Villages and municipalities in Nitra District